Syria is a country in Western Asia, bordering Lebanon and the Mediterranean Sea to the west, Turkey to the north, Iraq to the east, Jordan to the south, and Israel to the southwest. The geography of Syria includes fertile plains, high mountains, and deserts.

Ocean islands 

There are exactly five ocean islands belonging to Syria. They are all close to the Mediterranean Sea coast in the region of Tartus:

Jazirat Basirah: about 4,500 m2, it is located 770 metres from Syria beach. 
Arwad, largest island of Syria, and only inhabited one.
Al-Abbas: in the south Arwad Island, about 13.000 m2, it is located 3.49 kilometres from Arwad and 2,77 kilometres from Syria beach. 
Maqrud: rock island, about 3.000 m2, it is located 3.47 kilometres from Syria beach. 
Al-Faris: rock island, 2.000 m2, it is located 3.3 kilometres from Syria beach. 
Al-Faniyas: small rock island, near Abu al Faris island at northwest, ~ 100 m2.

Note: List of island from North to South.

Inland islands 
Qal'at Ja'bar: a castle on a hill-top which became an island with the formation of Lake Assad in 1974. 
 Jazirat al-Thawra: The Island of the Revolution is a designated nature reserve in Lake Assad.

References

Syria, List of islands of
Islands of Syria
Islands